The 1994 Paris–Nice was the 52nd edition of the Paris–Nice cycle race and was held from 6 March to 13 March 1994. The race started in Fontenay-sous-Bois and finished at the Col d'Èze. The race was won by Tony Rominger of the Mapei team.

General classification

References

1994
1994 in road cycling
1994 in French sport
March 1994 sports events in Europe